Windows MultiPoint Server is an operating system based on Microsoft Windows Server using Remote Desktop Services technology to host multiple simultaneous independent computing stations or terminals connected to a single computer (multiseat computing). Windows MultiPoint Server 2012 was the final release as an independent SKU and has been superseded by the MultiPoint Services role in Windows Server 2016.

Versions

Windows MultiPoint Server 2010
This version was planned in January 2010 but was released in February 2010 and is based on Windows Server 2008 R2.  It's mainstream support ended on July 14, 2015 and extended support ended on July 14, 2020. Multiple stations can be added to a WMS 2010 host computer by connecting a single monitor, USB 2.0 hub, keyboard and mouse for each station.  Hardware requirements for MultiPoint stations are non-proprietary, and virtually any multi-monitor video card, mouse, keyboard and monitor that is supported on Windows Server 2008 R2 can be used to build a station.

Windows MultiPoint Server 2010 is available for purchase via either OEMs or Academic Volume Licensing. The Academic version, acquired via Academic Volume Licensing, supports domain join and no licensing restrictions on station count (however, hardware limits still apply), but requires a Windows Server 2008 R2 CAL and a Windows MultiPoint Server 2010 CAL per station, while the non-Academic version that is acquired via OEMs is limited to 10 stations maximum and does not support domain join, but only requires a Windows MultiPoint Server 2010 CAL per station and no Windows Server 2008 R2 CALs.

Windows MultiPoint Server 2011
Windows MultiPoint Server 2011, based on Windows Server 2008 R2 SP1, was released to manufacturing on 10 March 2011.  It's mainstream support ended on July 12, 2016 and extended support ended on July 13, 2021. New features in Windows MultiPoint Server 2011 include:

 The ability to add connect stations and thin clients over the LAN via traditional RDP clients
 Support for RemoteFX capable thin clients
 A shared management console extensibility with Windows Small Business Server 2011 and Windows Home Server 2011
 The ability to be backed up by Windows Small Business Server Essentials 2011 (the only server SKU that allows and supports this)
 Features that allow administrators to view and interact with thumbnails of station desktops, including
 Projecting a single station's desktop to one or all stations
 Locking the keyboard and mouse of station and displaying a message
 Remotely opening and/or closing applications
 Restricting internet browsing to a specific list of sites or blocking browsing to a specific list of sites
 Management of multiple WMS servers and stations from within a single administration console
 Support for running within a virtual machine
 Distribution through a wider variety of distribution channels for both editions

In addition, unlike Windows MultiPoint Server 2010, Windows MultiPoint Server 2011 has Standard and Premium editions. The following table compares the two editions' differences; they share all other features equally.

Windows MultiPoint Server 2012
On 27 November 2012, Microsoft released Windows MultiPoint Server 2012 to manufacturing.  It's mainstream support ended on October 9, 2018 and extended support will end on October 10, 2023. This is the first version of MultiPoint to be based on Windows Server 2012, and contains several new features and upgrades from previous versions:

 The addition of the MultiPoint Dashboard, an application that allows specific non-administrator users to monitor and interact with user desktops
 The ability to create stations from virtual machines running on the WMS server Premium - Not available on the Standard version.
 Disk protection, a server feature that discards changes made to the server during user sessions similar to Windows SteadyState
 Windows 8 desktop experience for users, including access to the Windows Store
 Monitoring client computers running Windows 7 or 8 with the MultiPoint Server Connector

Windows Server 2016

Windows Server 2016 now includes MultiPoint Services as a role. This includes the ability to deploy a server in a multipoint role. This version was released on 26 September 2016.

Windows Server, version 1803
In Windows Server, version 1803, Microsoft is no longer developing the MultiPoint Services role as part of Windows Server. Only the MultiPoint Connector services are available through Feature on Demand for both Windows Server and Windows 10.

See also
 Multiseat configuration
 Microsoft Servers
 Windows Multipoint Mouse
 Windows Server

References

External links
 

Windows Server
2010 software
Proprietary software